The 1933 Los Angeles Angels season was the 31st season in the history of the Los Angeles Angels baseball team. The 1933 team won the Pacific Coast League (PCL) pennant with a 114–73 record. Jack Lelivelt was the team's manager. The team played its home games at Wrigley Field in Los Angeles. 

The Angels dominated the 1933 All-Pacific Coast League baseball team, claiming six of the twelve first-team spots. The first-team honorees were pitchers Buck Newsom and Dick Ward, third baseman Gene Lillard, shortstop Carl Dittmar, and outfielders Tuck Stainback and Jigger Statz.

Pitchers

Pitcher Bobo Newsom received the 1933 Pacific Coast League Most Valuable Player Award, receiving 44 of the 56 votes cast by West Coast baseball writers. Newsom led the PCL in both wins (30) and earned run average (3.18). Ward was sold to the New York Yankees after the 1933 season.

The Angels' 1933 pitching staff also included Dick Ward who compiled a 25–9 record for a team-beat .735 winning percentage. Ward was sold to the Chicago Cubs after the 1933 season.

Position players
Right fielder Tuck Stainback, a graduate of Los Angeles Fairfax High School, led the Angels with a .335 batting average and 264 hits. He gained attention before the season began when the Angels insured him for $75,000 – $25,000 for each leg and another $25,000 for his throwing arm.

Third baseman Gene Lillard compiled a .307 batting average, led the PCL with 44 home runs, and ranked third in the league with 149 RBIs (behind Joe DiMaggio and Prince Oana).

Center fielder Jigger Statz, at age 35, was the "old man" of the team, having played with the Angels, off-and-on, since 1920. In April 1933, the Angels held a day in his honor. During the 1933 season, Statz compiled a .325 batting average and ranked second on the team with 249 hits.

1933 PCL standings

Statistics

Batting 
Note: Pos = Position; G = Games played; AB = At bats; H = Hits; Avg. = Batting average; HR = Home runs; SLG = Slugging percentage

Pitching 
Note: G = Games pitched; IP = Innings pitched; W = Wins; L = Losses; PCT = Win percentage; ERA = Earned run average; SO = Strikeouts

References

Further reading
 "The Los Angeles Angels of the Pacific Coast League: A History, 1903-1957", Richard Beverage (McFarland 2011)
 "The Greatest Minor League: A History of the Pacific Coast League, 1903-1957", by Dennis Snelling (McFarland 2011)

1933 in sports in California
Pacific Coast League seasons